Thentu Lakshmu Naidu (Raja) is an Indian politician. He is son of Late Sri Thentu Jaya Prakash (elected as Member for State Legislative Assembly in 1983, 1985, 1989, 1994 and 2004). He was Member of Legislative Assembly representing the then Therlam constituency of Vizianagaram district, Andhra Pradesh state during 2008–2009. He unsuccessfully contested the Bobbili seat in 2009 and 2014.

2014-16 Nominated as AP State Civil Supplies Director

2016-19 Nominated as APSRTC REGIONAL CHAIRPERSON

2019 Nominated as BUDA CHAIRPERSON

References

Alumni of Staffordshire University
Living people
Andhra Pradesh MLAs 2004–2009
People from Vizianagaram district
Telugu Desam Party politicians
Year of birth missing (living people)
Telugu politicians
People from Uttarandhra